Moulidars is a commune in the department of Charente in the southwestern region of France. The encyclopedist Jules Trousset (1842–1905) was born in Médars.

Population

See also
Communes of the Charente department

References

Communes of Charente